The Chain is the sixth studio album by American country singer/songwriter Deana Carter, first released in 2007. Since, the album has peaked at #60 on the US Country chart. The first and only single off the album, "On the Road Again," was released in 2007, failing to land on the chart. All the tracks on the album consist of cover songs, and many are duets with artists, such as Dolly Parton and George Jones. The record was intended as a tribute to her father, Fred Carter Jr., and many of Deana Carter's heroes.

Track listing

Personnel
 John Anderson - vocals on "Swingin'"
 Deana Carter - lead vocals, background vocals
 Fred Carter Jr. - acoustic guitar, electric guitar, classical guitar
 Jeff Carter - electric guitar
 Jessi Colter - vocals on "I'm Not Lisa"
 Dan Dugmore - acoustic guitar, steel guitar, mandolin
 Shooter Jennings - vocals on "Good Hearted Woman"
 George Jones - vocals on "He Thinks I Still Care"
 Shawn Jones - electric guitar
 Kris Kristofferson - vocals on "Help Me Make It Through the Night"
 Randy Leago - accordion, flute, keyboards, organ, piano
 Willie Nelson - vocals on "On the Road Again"
 Dolly Parton - vocals on "Love Is Like a Butterfly"
 Harper Simon - electric guitar and vocals on "The Boxer"
 Paul Simon - acoustic guitar on "The Boxer"
 Kyle Woodring - drums
 Glenn Worf - bass guitar
 Andrea Zonn - viola, violin

Chart performance

2007 albums
Deana Carter albums
Vanguard Records albums
Tribute albums